The Third Lubbers cabinet, also called the Lubbers–Kok cabinet, was the executive branch of the Dutch government from 7 November 1989 to 22 August 1994. The cabinet was formed the christian-democratic Christian Democratic Appeal (CDA) and the social-democratic Labour Party (PvdA) after the election of 1989. The cabinet was a centrist grand coalition and had a substantial majority in the House of Representatives with Christian-Democratic Leader Ruud Lubbers serving as Prime Minister. Labour Leader Wim Kok served as Deputy Prime Minister and Minister of Finance.

The cabinet served during the final years of the turbulent 1980s and the early years of the economic boom of the 1990s. Domestically it focused on revitalizing the economy, reducing the deficit, and stimulating further deregulation and privatization. It had to deal with the El Al Flight 1862 Crash. Internationally the signing of the Maastricht Treaty took place but also it had to deal with several crises such as the beginning of the Bosnian War. The cabinet suffered several major internal conflicts including multiple resignations, but completed its entire term and was succeeded by the First Kok cabinet following the 1994 election.

Term
The cabinet was formed with a view to social reform. This was impossible because of the then bad shape of the Dutch economy, which made large reductions in government spending necessary. The reduction in spending on social care for disabled people led to demonstrations against the Dutch government in 1992. Many angry socialists left the Labour Party. The coalition lost heavily at the 1994 general election.

Several cabinet members returned after serving in previous cabinets: Minister of the Interior Ed van Thijn had served earlier in the same position from 1981 until 1982, Minister of Economic Affairs Koos Andriessen had served earlier in the same position from 1963 until 1965, Minister of Development Cooperation Jan Pronk had served earlier in the same position from 1973 until 1977 and State Secretary for Finance Marius van Amelsvoort had served earlier in the same position from 1980 until 1981.

Changes
On 18 September 1990 Minister of Agriculture, Nature and Fisheries Gerrit Braks (CDA) resigned after the Labour Party in the House of Representatives indicated that they had lost confidence in his ability to remain in office after strongly disagreeing in his animal welfare and fraud policy. Minister of Social Affairs and Employment Bert de Vries (CDA) served as acting Minister of Agriculture, Nature and Fisheries until 28 September 1990 when State Secretary for Economic Affairs Piet Bukman (CDA) was appointed as Minister of Agriculture, Nature and Fisheries. That same day Member of the House of Representatives Yvonne van Rooy (CDA), the former State Secretary for Economic Affairs was installed as his successor as State Secretary for Economic Affairs. That same day the function of State Secretary of Agriculture, Nature and Fisheries was re-implemented, Mayor of Haaksbergen Dzsingisz Gabor (CDA) was sworn in and assigned the portfolios of environmental policy, nature policy and agricultural management.

On 3 January 1993 Minister for Foreign Affairs Hans van den Broek (CDA) resigned after he was appointed as European Commissioner for External Relations and Enlargement. That same day Pieter Kooijmans (CDA), a former State Secretary for Foreign Affairs who until then had been working as a professor of International law at Leiden University, was appointed as his successor.

On 1 June 1993 State Secretary for Defence Berend-Jan van Voorst tot Voorst (CDA) resigned after he was appointed as Queen's Commissioner of Limburg. That same day Member of the House of Representatives Ton Frinking (CDA) succeed him.

On 5 June 1993 State Secretary for Social Affairs and Employment Elske ter Veld (PvdA) resigned after gaining insufficient support from her own Labour Party in the House of Representatives for a new widow's pension act. On 9 June 1993 State Secretary for Education and Sciences Jacques Wallage (PvdA) was appointed as her successor. That same day Roel in 't Veld (PvdA), who until then had been working as a professor of Public administration at the Erasmus University Rotterdam was installed as his successor as State Secretary for Education and Sciences. On 19 June 1993 just 10 days after taking office Roel in 't Veld resigned after he was discredited due to additional positions he held when he was a professor. On 2 July 1993 Job Cohen (PvdA), who until then had been working as rector magnificus of the State University of Limburg and as a professor of Jurisprudence, was appointed as his successor.

On 10 January 1994 Minister of the Interior Ien Dales (PvdA) unexpectedly died from a heart attack at the age of 62. Minister of Justice Ernst Hirsch Ballin (CDA) served as acting Minister of the Interior until 18 January 1994 when Mayor of Amsterdam Ed van Thijn (PvdA) was installed as Dales' successor.

On 26 February 1994 State Secretary for Welfare, Health and Culture Hans Simons (PvdA) resigned after he was appointed as a alderman in Rotterdam, but because the cabinet was already nearing the end of its term, he was not replaced.

On 27 May 1994 Minister of the Interior Ed van Thijn (PvdA) and Minister of Justice Ernst Hirsch Ballin (CDA) resigned over illegal interrogation techniques used by the police. They were succeeded by their State Secretaries, Dieuwke de Graaff-Nauta (CDA) became Minister of the Interior and Aad Kosto (PvdA) became Minister of Justice.

Due to the installment of a new European Parliament, several members resigned their functions to become members of this new parliament on 16 July 1994 and because the cabinet was already demissionary their portfolios were assigned to other ministers. The portfolio of Minister of Transport and Water Management was added to Minister of Economic Affairs Koos Andriessen (CDA), The portfolio of Minister of Welfare, Health and Culture was added to Minister of Education and Sciences Jo Ritzen (PvdA).

Cabinet members

Trivia
 Seven cabinet members had previous experience as scholars and professors: Ernst Hirsch Ballin (Constitutional and Administrative Law), Pieter Kooijmans (International human rights Law), Koos Andriessen (Political Economics), Jo Ritzen (Public and Education Economics), Bert de Vries (Business Economics), Roel in 't Veld (Public Administration) and Job Cohen (Jurisprudence).
 Seven members (later) served as Mayors: Ien Dales (Nijmegen), Ed van Thijn, Enneüs Heerma and Job Cohen (Amsterdam), Gerrit Braks (Eindhoven), Jacques Wallage (Groningen) and Dzsingisz Gabor (Haaksbergen).
 Six cabinet members later served as in high-profile international functions: Ruud Lubbers (United Nations High Commissioner for Refugees), Hans van den Broek (European Commissioner), Pieter Kooijmans (Judge of the International Court of Justice), Jan Pronk (Special Representative of the United Nations), Piet Bukman (President of the European People's Party) and Piet Dankert (President of the European Parliament).
 Five cabinet members where of Jewish decent: Ernst Hirsch Ballin (German-Ashkenazi), Ed van Thijn (Dutch-Ashkenazi), Hedy d'Ancona (Italian-Sephardi), Jacques Wallage (English-Ashkenazi) and Job Cohen (German-Ashkenazi).
 Four cabinet members (later) served as Queen's Commissioners: Relus ter Beek (Drenthe), Hanja Maij-Weggen (Zeeland), Hans Alders (Groningen) and Berend-Jan van Voorst tot Voorst (Limburg).
 Four cabinet members would later be granted the honorary title of Minister of State: Ruud Lubbers (1995), Wim Kok (2002), Hans van den Broek (2005) and Pieter Kooijmans (2007).
 On appointment, Koos Andriessen had served as Minister of Economic Affairs 24 years and 207 days previously, in the Marijnen cabinet.

References

External links
Official

  Kabinet-Lubbers III Parlement & Politiek
  Kabinet-Lubbers III Rijksoverheid

Cabinets of the Netherlands
1989 establishments in the Netherlands
1994 disestablishments in the Netherlands
Cabinets established in 1989
Cabinets disestablished in 1994
Grand coalition governments